The Ourauwhare River is a river of the Auckland Region of New Zealand's North Island. It is a tributary of the Kaukapakapa River, which it meets south of Helensville.

See also
List of rivers of New Zealand

References

Rivers of the Auckland Region
Kaipara Harbour catchment